Denese Oates (born 1955) is an Australian sculptor. She specialises in creating abstract forms from masses of intertwined copper wire; her work is held in the permanent collection at Parliament House, Canberra and the University of New South Wales.

Biography 
Oates was born in Orange, New South Wales. She later moved to Sydney to study at Alexander Mackie College (now the College of Fine Art at the University of New South Wales).

In 1979 Oates was a finalist for the Archibald Prize.

References 

1955 births
Living people
20th-century Australian women artists
20th-century Australian artists
Artists from New South Wales
Australian women sculptors